The Caatinga cacholote (Pseudoseisura cristata) is a species of bird in the family Furnariidae. It is endemic to the Caatinga in northeastern Brazil. Formerly, it was considered conspecific with P. unirufa under the common name rufous cacholote. Common habitats include shrubs, graze land, and areas near human dwellings. Birds of this family build dome shaped nests made with clay or plant material.

References

 Zimmer, K., and Whittaker, A. (2000). The Rufous Cacholote (Furnariidae: Pseudoseisura) is two species. Condor. 102(2): 409–422.
Bezerra, Claudia Mendonca, et al. “DESCRIPTION OF AN AMAZING NEST OF CAATINGA CACHALOTE Pseudoseisura Cristata INFESTED BY Psammolestes Tertius IN TAUA, STATE OF CEARA, NORTHEASTERN BRAZIL.” Revista De Patologia Tropical / Journal of Tropical Pathology, www.revistas.ufg.br/iptsp/article/view/54214.

Llambías, Paulo E., et al. “Breeding Success and Social Mating System of the Bay-Capped Wren-Spinetail (Spartonoica Maluroides).” The Wilson Journal of Ornithology, vol. 121, no. 4, 2009, pp. 803–807. JSTOR, www.jstor.org/stable/20616990.

Pseudoseisura
Birds of the Caatinga
Endemic birds of Brazil
Birds described in 1824
Taxonomy articles created by Polbot